Woldgate is a minor road in the East Riding of Yorkshire, England, which follows the line of a Roman road. For most of its length Woldgate follows a low ridge of the Yorkshire Wolds, with extensive views to north and south.

The Roman road ran from the coast at Bridlington to York.  Its line can be traced west from the western end of Woldgate along a series of bridleways and minor roads, and then a stretch of the A166, to Stamford Bridge, where it crossed the River Derwent by a ford.

Woldgate was the subject of a series of landscapes created in 2006 by the artist David Hockney.

National Cycle Route 1 follows the eastern part of Woldgate.

References

External links 

Roads in Yorkshire
Transport in the East Riding of Yorkshire
Roman roads in England
Yorkshire Wolds